Woods County is a county located in the northwestern part of the U.S. state of Oklahoma. As of the 2010 census, the population was 8,878. Its county seat is Alva. The county is named after Samuel Newitt Wood, a renowned Kansas populist.

History
The Burnham site in Woods County is a pre-Clovis site, that is, an archaeological site dating before 11,000 years ago.
The region of Woods County, Oklahoma, was home to the Antelope Creek Phase of Southern Plains Villagers, a precontact culture of Native Americans, who are related to the Wichita and Affiliated Tribes.

An early European explorer of the area now contained within Woods County was George C. Sibley, who traveled through  in 1811. He visited a salt formation near the present town of Freedom, Oklahoma, then followed the Mountain Fork of the Arkansas River southeastward to the Great Salt Plains. In 1843, Nathan Boone traveled along the Cimarron River.

The area was part of Cherokee Outlet, guaranteed to the Cherokee Nation under the Treaty of New Echota. It later became important for cattle ranching. The Dodge City and Red Fork Trail, a branch of the Chisholm Trail followed the north bank of the Cimarron River en route to Kansas. The U. S. Government acquired the Cherokee Outlet under Congressional Acts in 1889, 1891 and 1893, and divided the area into counties. One of these was designated M County, prior to opening the area for settlement. The Secretary of the Interior designated Alva as the county seat. M County was renamed Woods County by a ballot measure on November 6, 1894. The name was one of three put forth on the ballot, and was the Populists party's submission to honor Samuel Newitt Wood, a Kansas Populist. Despite the name being misspelled on the ballot, the election committee "decided to keep the s for euphony sake". Woods County became part of Oklahoma Territory.

The Constitutional Convention of 1906 created Major County and Alfalfa County from southern and eastern parts of Woods County and added a part of Woodward County to Woods County.

Geography
It is located along the Kansas border.

Major highways
  U.S. Highway 64
  U.S. Highway 281
  State Highway 11
  State Highway 14
  State Highway 34
  State Highway 45

Adjacent counties
 Comanche County, Kansas (north)
 Barber County, Kansas (northeast)
 Alfalfa County (east)
 Major County (south)
 Woodward County (southwest)
 Harper County (west)

Demographics

As of the 2010 United States Census, there were 8,878 people, 3,533 households, and 2,133 families residing in the county.  The population density was 7 people per square mile (3/km2).  There were 4,478 housing units at an average density of 3.5 per square mile (1.3/km2).  The racial makeup of the county was 88.4% white, 3.3% black or African American, 2.4% Native American, 0.9% Asian, less than 0.1% Pacific Islander, 2.3% from other races, and 2.7% from two or more races.  4.8% of the population were Hispanic or Latino of any race.

There were 3,533 households, out of which 23.2% had children under the age of 18 living with them, 47.9% were married couples living together, 7.6% had a female householder with no husband present, and 40.2% were non-families.  32.3% of households were made up of individuals, and 8.8% had someone living alone who was 65 years of age or older.  8.2% of the population was institutionalized The average household size was 2.23 and the average family size was 2.82.

In the county, the population was spread out, with 18.8% under the age of 18, 18.6% from 18 to 24, 22.3% from 25 to 44, 23.1% from 45 to 64, and 17.2% who were 65 years of age or older.  The median age was 34.7 years.  For every 100 females there were 114.8 males.  For every 100 females age 18 and over, there were 109.9 males.

The median income for a household in the county was $47,255, and the median income for a family was $60,500.  Males had a median income of $39,754 versus $23,897 for females.  The per capita income for the county was $22,935.  About 8% of families and 16% of the population were below the poverty line, including 10% of those age 65 or over.

Politics

Communities

 Alva (county seat)
 Avard
 Brink
 Capron
 Dacoma
 Freedom
 Hopeton
 Loder
 Lookout
 Noel
 Waynoka

Former communities
A 1911 map of Woods County shows a large number of settlements which either no longer exist or remain only as small populated places, including:

 Abbie
 Cora
 Coy
 Eagle
 Fairvalley
 Fanshaw
 Farry
 Faulkner
 Fitzlen
 Flagg
 Galena
 Gamet
 Heman
 Irene 
 Kingman
 Saratoga
 Tegarden
 Whitehorse
 Winchester

NRHP Sites

There are multiple NRHP sites in the county, mostly in Alva but with some in Waynoka.

See also
 Little Sahara State Park
 National Register of Historic Places listings in Woods County, Oklahoma

References

 
1893 establishments in Oklahoma Territory
Populated places established in 1893